Le Jour du Seigneur (English: The Day of God) is a France 2 religious programme that presents Christianity, usually broadcasting Catholic mass and services, amongst other things related to religion. It was the first broadcast Vatican Catholic mass and is the longest running French television show. The show was first broadcast on October 1949, an overall total of 73 years, one of the highest lengths ever for a TV show. The show was originally called L'Emission religieuse (The Religious Show) and later renamed Le Jour du Seigneur in 1954. The show has experienced a significant drop of television viewers over the span of several decades due to the decline of religious observance, and overall decline in rates of Christianity.

References

External links
Official site
 

1949 French television series debuts
1940s French television series
1950s French television series
1960s French television series
1970s French television series
1980s French television series
1990s French television series
2000s French television series
2010s French television series
2020s French television series
Television series about Christianity
French-language television shows
TF1 original programming
France 2
Catholic media
Religious television series